Sam Wolstenholme (born 21 June 1999) is an English rugby union player, for Leicester Tigers in Premiership Rugby.  His playing position is scrum-half.

Career
Wolstenholme attended Oakham School and he went to Loughborough University to study economics, whilst still part of Yorkshire Carnegie academy.

Wolstenholme made his first team debut for Yorkshire Carnegie in the British and Irish Cup pool game against London Scottish at Ilkley in October 2017. He marked the occasion with the clinching try to secure victory for his side. He has been a regular for Hull Ionians on dual registration but originally came from Sheffield RUFC. Wolstenholme made his first start for Yorkshire Carnegie in the British & Irish Cup against the Dragons Premiership Select at the CCBC Centre For Sporting Excellence in Ystrad Mynach in December 2017.

On 24 June 2019, Wolstenholme left Yorkshire Carnegie to join Wasps in the Premiership Rugby from the 2019–20 season. He made his debut for Wasps against Saracens in the Premiership Rugby Cup at the start of the 2019–20 season. He scored a try in another Cup match against Sale Sharks in October 2019. Wasps entered administration on 17 October 2022 and Wolstenholme was made redundant along with all other players and coaching staff.

On 1st January 2023, Leicester Tigers announced his arrival on a short term contract.

References

External links
Wasps Profile
ESPN Profile
Its Rugby Profile
Ultimate Rugby Profile

1999 births
Living people
English rugby union players
Leeds Tykes players
Rugby union players from Sheffield
Wasps RFC players
Rugby union scrum-halves